Leonita was the name of two steamships operated by José Luis de Ansoleaga.

,  cargo vessel foundered in March 1921 west off Gibraltar.

Ship names